Claudio Bonoldi (26 October 1783 – 14 February 1846 ) was an Italian tenor.

Musical career
Bonoldi started his career as a lyric tenor, particularly suited to cover roles in opera buffa. Over the time, when his vocal timbre became darker and more resonant, he interpreted more dramatic parts, such as Pollione in Vincenzo Bellini's Norma. He also sang the roles of bass, such as Assur in Semiramide by Gioachino Rossini and Don Giovanni by Wolfgang Amadeus Mozart. His voice was categorised as baritenor.

He studied singing in his hometown with maestro Giacomo Carcani (1734–1820) and perfected his vocal training with maestro B. Gherardi. He began his career in 1803 at Teatro d'Angennes in Turin performing in parts of second half character. He made his debut at Teatro alla Scala in 1811 as Peronio in the premiere performance of Giuseppe Farinelli's Annibale in Capua. Rossini wrote for him the role of Giocondo for La pietra del paragone that was premiered on 26 September 1812 at La Scala.

Bonoldi has performed in many noted opera houses around Italy such as Teatro San Carlo in Naples, Teatro Argentina in Rome, Teatro Sant'Agostino in Genoa, Teatro Comunale di Bologna, Teatro Ducale in Parma, Teatro Carcano in Milan, Teatro la Fenice in Venice, Teatro Regio in Turin, Teatro Comunale in Trieste, Teatro della Società in Rovigo, Teatro Avvalorati in Livorno, Teatro Filarmonico in Verona, Teatro Municipale in Piacenza, Teatro lirico in Padova, Teatro Riccardi in Bergamo and Teatro Municipale in Cuneo. 

Public success that he achieved in Italy allowed him to engage in theaters around France and Spain, where he received the nomination of Virtuoso da Camera from the King of Spain.

He retired from stage in 1842 and later teach opera singing at Milan Conservatory. He died in Lombardy's capital in 1846.

Repertoire
 Giuseppe Farinelli
 Annibale in Capua (Peronio), Milan, 1811
 La chiarina (L'aiutante), Milan, 1815
 Giuseppe Mosca
 Le bestie in uomini (Riccardo), Milan, 1812
 I pretendenti delusi (Il conte Odoardo), Milan, 1813
 Stefano Pavesi
 Nitteti (Amasi), Turin, 1811
 Ser Marcantonio (Medoro), Milan, 1812
 I riti d'Efeso (Agenore), Parma, 1812
 Un avvertimento ai gelosi (il conte di Ripaverde), Milan, 1813
 La muta di Portici (Masaniello), Venice, 1831
 Pietro Generali
 Adelina (Erneville), Trieste, 1812
 L'amore prodotto dall'odio (Don Rammiro), Milan, 1813
 Bajazet (Acmet), Turin, 1813
 I baccanali di Roma (Sempronio), Faenza, 1818
 Adelaide di Borgogna (Ottone), Milan, 1819
 Pietro Alessandro Guglielmi
 Ernesto e Palmira (Ernesto), Milan, 1813
 Ercole Paganini
 Cesare in Egitto (Tolomeo), Turin, 1814
 Carlo Coccia
 Euristea (Tebandro), Venice, 1815
 Ferdinando Paër
 L'eroismo in amore, Milan, 1815
 Joseph Weigl
 Il ritorno d'Astrea (Cantata), Milan, 1815
 La famiglia svizzera (Jakob), Milan, 1816
 Michele Carafa
 Ifigenia in Tauride (Oreste), Napoli, 1817
 Peter Winter
 I due Valdomiri (Ulrico), Milan, 1817
 Giovanni Pacini
 Vallace (Vallace), Milan, 1820
 Temistocle (Temistocle), Milan, 1823
 Gioachino Rossini
 La pietra del paragone (Giocondo), Milan, 1812
 Sigismondo (Ladislao), Turin, 1814
 Armida (Ubaldo e Germano), Napoli, 1817
 Ciro in Babilonia (Baldassarre), Milan, 1818
 Otello (Otello), Trieste, 1818
 Bianca e Falliero (Contareno), Milan, 1819
 Aureliano in Palmira (Aureliano), Venice, 1820
 Eduardo e Cristina (Carlo), Lucca, 1820
 Maometto secondo (Paolo Erisso), Milan, 1824
 Semiramide (Assur), Padova, 1824
 Domenico Cimarosa
 Gli Orazi e i Curiazi (Marco Orazio), Parma, 1811
 Giovanni Paisiello
 Il barbiere di Siviglia (Lindoro), Milan, 1811
 Giovanni Simone Mayr
 Elisa (Teorindo), Milan, 1813
 La rosa bianca e la rosa rossa (Vanoldo), Genova, 1813
 Ginevra di Scozia (Polinesso), Milan, 1816
 Atar (Assur), Genova, 1814
 Vincenzo Bellini
 Norma (Pollione), Milan, 1832
 Beatrice di Tenda (Filippo Visconti), Milan, 1833
 Gaetano Donizetti
 L'esule di Roma (Fulvio) Trieste, 1833
 Torquato Tasso (Torquato Tasso), Cuneo, 1835
 Il furioso all'isola di San Domingo (Cardenio), Cuneo, 1835
 Giacomo Meyerbeer
 Semiramide riconosciuta (Ircano), Turin, 1819
 Wolfgang Amadeus Mozart
 Don Giovanni (Don Giovanni), Milan, 1816
 Carlo Evasio Soliva
 La testa di bronzo (Federico), Milan, 1816
 Berenice d'Armenia (Lucio Antonino), Turin, 1816
 Giulia e Sesto Pompeo (Ottavio), Milan, 1817
 Paolo Bonfichi
 Abradate e Dircea (Ciro), Turin, 1817
 Beniowski (Igor), Venice, 1831
 Gaspare Spontini
 La Vestale (Cinna), Milan, 1824
 Gustavo Carulli
 I tre mariti (Belmont), Milan, 1824
 Francesco Sampieri
 Pompeo in Siria (Clearco), Milan, 1824
 Antonio Sapienza
 Gonzalvo (Ferdinando), Milan, 1825
 Giuseppe Persiani
 Danao re d'Argo (Danao), Livorno, 1827
 Giuseppe Nicolini
 Ilda D'Avenel (Fergusto), Bergamo, 1828
 Il conte di Lenosse (Clarendon), Venice, 1830
 Ramon Carnicier
 Elena e Costantino, Barcelona, 1822
 Don Giovanni Tentorio, Barcelona, 1822

References

Bibliography
 Giampiero Tintori, 200 ans d'opéra La Scala, Ken Art S.A. Editeur, Geneva, 1979.
 Rodolfo Celletti, Voce di tenore. Dal Rinascimento a oggi, storia e tecnica, ruoli e protagonisti di un mito della lirica, Idea Libri, Milan, 1989. 
 Giorgio Appolonia, Le voci di Rossini, prefazione di Giorgio Gualerzi, Eda, Turin, 1992.
 Gustavo Marchesi, Canto e cantanti, Casa Ricordi, Milan, 1996. 
 Evaristo Pagani, Raccolte Biografiche Cantanti Lirici Italiani, edito in proprio, Albino, 2009.
 Franco C. Ricci, Bonoldi, Claudio, in Alberto Maria Ghisalberti (a cura di), Dizionario Biografico degli Italiani, Rome, Istituto della Enciclopedia Italiana, 1971, volume 12 (on-line in Treccani.it)

1783 births
1846 deaths
Italian opera singers
People from Piacenza